Joseph Liouville   (24 March 1809 – 8 September 1882) was a French mathematician and engineer.

Life and work 

He was born in Saint-Omer in France on 24 March 1809. His parents were Claude-Joseph Liouville (an army officer) and Thérèse Liouville (née Balland).

Liouville gained admission into the École Polytechnique in 1825 and graduated in 1827. Just like Augustin-Louis Cauchy before him, Liouville studied engineering at École des Ponts et Chaussées after graduating from the Polytechnique, but opted instead for a career in mathematics. After some years as an assistant at various institutions including the École Centrale Paris, he was appointed as professor at the École Polytechnique in 1838. He obtained a chair in mathematics at the Collège de France in 1850 and a chair in mechanics at the Faculté des Sciences in 1857.

Besides his academic achievements, he was very talented in organisational matters. Liouville founded the Journal de Mathématiques Pures et Appliquées which retains its high reputation up to today, in order to promote other mathematicians' work. He was the first to read, and to recognize the importance of, the unpublished work of Évariste Galois which appeared in his journal in 1846. Liouville was also involved in politics for some time, and he became a member of the Constituting Assembly in 1848. However, after his defeat in the legislative elections in 1849, he turned away from politics.

Liouville worked in a number of different fields in mathematics, including number theory, complex analysis, differential geometry and topology, but also mathematical physics and even astronomy. He is remembered particularly for Liouville's theorem. In number theory, he was the first to prove the existence of transcendental numbers by a construction using continued fractions (Liouville numbers). In mathematical physics, Liouville made two fundamental contributions: the Sturm–Liouville theory, which was joint work with Charles François Sturm, and is now a standard procedure to solve certain types of integral equations by developing into eigenfunctions, and the fact (also known as Liouville's theorem) that time evolution is measure preserving for a Hamiltonian system. In Hamiltonian dynamics, Liouville also introduced the notion of action-angle variables as a description of completely integrable systems. The modern formulation of this is sometimes called the Liouville–Arnold theorem, and the underlying concept of integrability is referred to as Liouville integrability.

In 1851, he was elected a foreign member of the Royal Swedish Academy of Sciences. In 1853, he was elected as a member of the American Philosophical Society.

The crater Liouville on the Moon is named after him. So is the Liouville function, an important function in number theory.

See also
List of things named after Joseph Liouville
 Liouville's theorem (disambiguation)

Notes

References
 
 
 Lutzen J., "Liouville's differential calculus of arbitrary order and its electrodynamical  origin", in  Proc. 19th Nordic Congress Mathematicians. 1985. Icelandic Mathematical Society, Reykjavik, pp. 149–160.

Further reading

External links
 
 

École Polytechnique alumni
École des Ponts ParisTech alumni
Corps des ponts
1809 births
1882 deaths
19th-century French mathematicians
Mathematical analysts
Members of the French Academy of Sciences
Members of the Royal Swedish Academy of Sciences
Foreign Members of the Royal Society
Members of the Göttingen Academy of Sciences and Humanities